Lam Ching-ying (born Lam Gun-bo; 27 December 1947 – 8 November 1997) was a Hong Kong stuntman, actor, and action director. As a practitioner of martial arts Lam starred in a number of notable films that found recognition outside Hong Kong including Encounters of the Spooky Kind, The Prodigal Son and his best known role in Mr. Vampire.

Biography

Childhood years
He was born Lam Gun-bo (林根寶) on 27 December 1952 in the year of the Dragon, in Hong Kong. His family originated from Shanghai, in the People's Republic of China. Both of his parents made a living by doing catering services. Lam was the third child of six children. His family was poor, and his parents weren't educated. Lam attended Shun Yi Association Elementary School in Hong Kong, but eventually dropped out after 2 years. His father sent him to Chun Chau Drama Society to learn the Peking Opera style under the guidance of Madame Fan Fok Fa.

Due to his slender and fragile body structure, Lam specialized in female roles and often performed stunt-doubling for actresses. However, he was reported as a mischievous and disobedient child. Thus, after half a year of training, Madame sent him on stage to express himself and control his drive. Lam's first show was called "White Beach", but his Beijing Opera career only lasted for 5 years. He realized that there was not much demand for opera styles anymore. Through a friend's introduction, Lam joined the film industry.

Early life
At age 17, Lam became a stuntman and martial arts coach at the Shaw Brothers Studio. Due to his slender build, he was often called upon to substitute female actors. He received $HK60 a day, $HK20 of which went to his master, and another $HK20 he took home to his parents. Lam used the remaining money to treat his brothers to snacks. Lam once mentioned those were his happiest days in his life.

There was a story that Lam challenged Bruce Lee in a hotel room because he didn't believe Lee was as strong as the rumors said. Lam put a pillow over his chest and stomach, then Bruce struck the pillow and sent him flying across the room. Bruce Lee was so impressed that he hired Lam as his personal assistant. Lam was 19 at the time.

Lam started to work as an co-action choreographer, and personal assistant to Bruce Lee on Lee's movies including The Big Boss, Fist of Fury, Enter the Dragon, Way of the Dragon, and Game of Death. In his youth, Lam seemed to have quite a temper and always got into fights. During the filming of "The Big Boss", Lam was arrested for fighting, and Lee had to bail him out of jail.

Despite having little education, Lam impressed Lee with interesting philosophical discussions. Although they hardly talked about their relationship, Lee liked good conversations, and this self-willed young man soon became Lee's favorite.
 
When Lee died, Lam was devastated. He later joined Hung's stuntman association (known as the Hung Kar Pan).

1980s
Lam worked behind the camera as assistant director and became Sammo's right-hand man of the stunt team. His talent as an actor and martial artist was revealed in The Magnificent Butcher. Lam played the fan-wielding assassin who fought against Yuen Biao.

In 1982, Lam won the Hong Kong Film Award for Best Action Director, in the film Prodigal Son. Prodigal Son featured what is widely acknowledged as among the best Wing Chun caught on film, performed by Lam. Lam played the strict kung fu master Leung Yee-tai. This was probably his most historic role. Lam even shaved his own eyebrows to give Master Leung a more feminine portrayal. He was able to bring a cool, sweet quality to this sharp and hard-nosed character.

He also played a frail, elderly Taoist priest in The Dead and the Deadly (1983).

Lam's star did not rise until 1985, with the release of Mr. Vampire, the movie that fueled the hopping vampire genre. Lam was nominated for Best Actor for his role as the Taoist priest. The character was an engaging mixture of naivety and stoic authority, and became a favorite for audiences. Lam was to reprise this role many times throughout his career.

Shortly after the release of Mr. Vampire, the Golden Harvest film company attempted to make an English version of the movie with Tanya Roberts (of Charlie's Angels) and Jack Scalia. Lam's role was played by longtime kung fu film actor Yuen Wah. Due to various difficulties, the film was never made.

In the following years, Lam starred as the Taoist Priest in countless sequels and spin-offs of Mr. Vampire such as Mr. Vampire II (1986), Mr. Vampire III (1987), Vampire Vs. Vampire (1989), Magic Cop (1990),  Encounters of the Spooky Kind II (1990)

He also appeared in different movie genres such as The Return of Pom Pom (1984), School on Fire (1988), Painted Faces (1988), and Her Vengeance (1988). Lam proved that his dramatic acting skill was just as good as his kung fu skill. It is argued that whether the huge success of Mr. Vampire was the best thing that happened in his career because it forever typecast him as the vampire slayer. Yet Lam had many heartbreaking and mind-stirring portrayals in other movie genres.

In 1989, Lam directed his first movie Vampire Vs. Vampire. The movie starred him as the usual One Eyebrow Priest, Chin Siu Ho and Liu Fong as his naughty disciples. Due to the production cost going over budget, he didn't take his director's fee. The movie showed light of his moving-making style which was prone to realistic fights and dark humor. The movie didn't become a huge success, but his candor made people re-think the purposes of film-making. It also suggested new ideas in the genre which later influenced other Hong Kong ghost movies. Vampire Vs. Vampire offered a new look about the encounter between Chinese and Western culture. The One Eyebrow Priest also raised a vampire kid in his own house. This went against traditional rules of Maoshan Taoism. Even until now, people often find Lam Ching Ying's shadow in later Chinese ghost movies.

1990s
The success of Mr. Vampire eventually became burdensome on Lam, who found himself typecast in the role. As the Hong Kong movie industry began to experience a decline, quality roles for Lam also began to dry. However, he continued to take on his usual role as the Taoist priest as well as supporting roles in low budget movies.

In 1990, Lam became the film producer for Magic Cop (1990), an underrated action movie. He starred in and action directed the movie. The fight scenes between him and the Japanese again showed his excellence as an action choreographer.

Some of his other ghost movies during these years are Crazy Safari (1991), An Eternal Combat (1991), The Ultimate Vampire (1991) Spiritual Trinity (1991), Mad Mad Ghost (1992), Banana Spirit (1992). Again, his serious acting side can be seen in Pom Pom and Hot Hot (1992), Lover's Tear (1992). He had supporting roles in these movies, but his roles are very memorable.

In 1995, although the film market was in depression, ATV offered Lam the starring role in a television series called Vampire Expert (殭屍道長). He was hired with a million HK dollars salary to work in the series. It was a far cry from his time as $HK60 a day stuntman. The series was a success and revived Lam's career. The story followed Mo Siu Fong (Lam Ching Ying) who destroyed ghosts and saved the day. During the filming, Lam developed a relationship with his co-star Kingdom Yuen. In the series, Yuen played a female priest who fell in love with Mo Siu Fong (Lam Ching Ying). At the end of the filming, they were actually in love.

The second series was filmed and aired in 1996. The series starred Lam Ching Ying again as the humble priest, Mang Hoi, Frankie Lam and Annie Man as his disciples. Like the first series, the second series received high ratings and support from China, Hong Kong and Taiwan.

Soon after that, Lam signed for another TV series called Coincidentally (情定阴阳界). The series borrowed the cast of Vampire Expert and had Lam in a supporting role. Lam played a priest who tried to prevent a man from becoming a cruel spirit. However, this series didn't mark the end of his career. Lam's last role was in A Monk at Thirty (一枝花和尚). The role was so heartbreaking that many of his fans doubted he was actually playing his own death.

In 1996, production on the third series of Vampire Expert began. The production was halted due to Lam's health condition. Contrary to rumors that the cancer was caused by years of heavy drinking, the cancer was hereditary.

Family
Lam Ching-ying married Cheng Bing Bing in 1983. They had two children, a daughter Lam Sik-nga (林式瓦) in 1985 and a son Lam Ka-yiu (林家耀) in 1988. The children loved to watch their father's movies. The couple divorced in 1988. Child custody was given to the father. Lam sent his children to the U.S to study.

During the filming of Vampire Expert in 1995, Lam and his co-star Kingdom Yuen developed a relationship. However in 1996, Lam broke up with Yuen when they were in love. He then packed up and moved to his sister's house. Yuen talked about Lam after his death: 
"In fact, he was sick. I always knew it. But he didn't want to be disturbed, so he moved to a place where no-one could see him. He also didn't allow me to visit him. Before leaving, he said: "I cannot stay by your side anymore. Take good care of yourself. If you have problems, ask your brother to help you." I was reluctant to let him leave, but I respected his choice. He was the kind of man that when he decided something, it would be impossible to stop him... As an actor, he wanted people to see the most beautiful, brilliant moments. He didn't allow me to visit him. Because he knew that if I had seen him like this, it would have been very painful".

Death

Rumor about cancer
During the summer of 1997 Lam had been repeatedly going to the hospital for tests. Rumours were spreading that he had liver cancer. He stubbornly insisted on leaving the hospital immediately and finishing his job, unwilling to be hospitalised. He received worried phone calls from friends, but he told them not to listen to gossip.

It is unknown when Lam was diagnosed with cancer for the first time since he forbid his close family to reveal his illness. Some of his close friends stated that they noticed his illness, but no-one dared to ask him directly. Chin Kar Lok said in an interview:

"One time I had to break through a 10 ft glass wall and before that, I had to work on a ship to jump from the 2nd floor to the 1st floor. Everyone knew it was a painful shot. Hung Kam Bo wanted me to do that job. But Lam refused to let me do that and he took that action…it was really a big pain shot. He was hurt after he did that shot. Like what I said before, working as a stuntman in the 80s is like a family and there is no selfishness.

He was very kind to me, even in a later movie, he found me for the main actor. He really took care of me. He had the spirit. He was not a smooth talker. But he used his brain a lot. He taught us not to be lazy, to give 100% every time, no tricks. He set a very good example to us. He had a good heart for movies, even when he was sick at the end of his life. He didn't show to us he was in pain. He was even shooting a movie with us. I think he is really the real hero. I miss him very much."

Final weeks
Lam broke up with his girlfriend Kingdom Yuen. Two weeks before his death, Lam moved to his sister's house. He refused visits from his children and friends. Lam started to lose his consciousness over and over again at the beginning of November. His family moved him to the St. Teresa Hospital in Kowloon. He was already in a semi-comatose state, and his situation gradually declined.

Lam died on November 8th 1997 at 12:30 am at St. Theresa's Hospital in Hong Kong, the cause of death being cancer of the liver. He was 44 years old. Ricky Hui who was Lam's partner in "Mr. Vampire", died on November 8th 2011, the same date, 14 years later.

The funeral
Lam's request was to have a low-profile funeral. His funeral was attended by his parents, close family and school-mate friends. The Buddhist ceremony was held in the evening of the 13th at around 7 am. His Priest robe, shoes and top-hat were buried with him, along with his favorite clothes and sunglasses.
Lam's pallbearers were Yuen Shiu Hung, Chin Yuet Sun, Ng Ming Hoi, Lam King Chu, Chan Wui Ngai, Chung Fat, Sammo Hung, Chan Wing Hong, Chin Kar Lok and Wu Ma.

After the funeral his remains were cremated and buried in the U.S. with a calligraphy:
"One Smile Returns To The West"

Tribute
The first series of My Date with a Vampire produced by ATV was dedicated to him, and the entire series was loosely based in the future of Vampire Expert.

The 2013 Hong Kong horror movie Rigor Mortis is a tribute to Mr. Vampire, and one of the stars is Lam Ching-Ying's fellow co-star in that film, Chin Siu-ho.

Selected filmography

 The Big Boss (1971) (Actor / Assistant action director)
 Fist of Fury (1972) (Stuntman)
 Enter the Dragon (1973) (Stuntman / Assistant action director)
 Broken Oath (1977) (Actor)
 Legend of the Bat (1978)
 Clan of Amazons (1978)
 Encounters of the Spooky Kind (1980) (Action Director / Actor)
 The Prodigal Son (1982) (Action Director / Actor)
 The Dead and the Deadly (1983) (Actor / Stuntman / Action director)
 Winners And Sinners (1983) (Actor / Action director)
 Pom Pom (1984) (Actor)
 Hocus Pocus (1984) (Actor)
 Those Merry Souls (1985) (Actor / Action Director)
 My Lucky Stars (1985) (Actor / Action Director)
 Mr. Vampire (1985) (Actor / Action Director)
 Millionaire's Express (1986) (Actor / Action Director)
 Heroes Shed No Tears (1986) (Actor)
 Mr. Vampire II (1986) (Actor)
 Eastern Condors (1987) (Actor / Action Director)
 Mr. Vampire III (1987) (Actor / Action Director)
 I Love Maria (1988) (Actor)
 Lego Movie 85 (1988) (Actor)
 Painted Faces (1988) (Actor)
 Paper Marriage (1988) (Action director)
 Pedicab Driver (1989) (Brief appearance)
 Vampire Vs. Vampire (1989) (Actor / Director)
 Magic Cop (1989) (Actor / Action Director / Producer)
 School on Fire (1989) (Actor)
 The Swordsman (1990) (Actor)
 Lover's Tear (1991) (Actor / Action Director / Producer)
 Slickers vs. Killers (1991) (Actor)
 The Ultimate Vampire (1991) (Actor)
 Crazy Safari (1991) (Actor)
 Red and Black (1991) (Actor)
 Painted Skin (1992) (Actor)
 Pom Pom and Hot Hot (1992) (Actor)
 The Legend of Wong Tai Sin (1992) (Actor)
 Exorcist Master (1993) (Actor)
 Kung Fu Kid (1994) (Actor)
 The Green Hornet (1994) (Director / Producer / Actor)

Awards
1983  Hong Kong Film Awards
Nominated and won "Best Action Choreography" in Prodigal Son

1984  Hong Kong Film Awards
Nominated and won  "Best Action Choreography" in Winners And Sinners

1986  Hong Kong Film Awards
Nominated for "Best Action Choreography" in My Lucky Stars

1986 Hong Kong Film Awards
Nominated for "Best Supporting Actor" in Mr Vampire

See also
Sammo Hung
Wu Ma
Chin Kar Lok

References

External links
Lam Ching Ying Memorial network
Lam Ching Ying, Master For All Seasons - Unofficial Site
Memory of Lam Ching Ying
 The Place For Lam Ching Ying Fans - Forum

 Lam Ching Ying Tribute Page on Myspace
Top Classic Kung Fu Artist of all time at KungFuMovieMadness.com

1952 births
1997 deaths
Action choreographers
20th-century Hong Kong male actors
Hong Kong Taoists
Hong Kong kung fu practitioners
Hong Kong film directors
Deaths from cancer in Hong Kong